"High 'n' Dry (Saturday Night)" is the 1981 title track by English heavy metal band Def Leppard from their multi-platinum album High 'n' Dry. It was ranked number 33 on VH1's 40 Greatest Metal Songs. It is one of five songs by Def Leppard which had a promotional video, but were not worldwide single releases; it was, however, released as a single in Australia.

History
This song made the "Filthy Fifteen", a list of songs criticised by the Parents Music Resource Center (PMRC), for having explicit lyrics that describe alcohol use and intoxication. The group's mission was "to educate and inform parents" about "the growing trend in music towards lyrics that are sexually explicit, excessively violent, or glorify the use of drugs and alcohol," and to seek the censorship and rating of music. In 2016, lead singer Joe Elliott commented on the alcoholic nature of the song, stating that during the recording of the album, producer Robert John "Mutt" Lange was attempting to turn him into a "beer-swilling bastard" in the music, which he was not in real life.

References

Def Leppard songs
1981 songs
Songs about drugs
Songs about alcohol
Songs about nights
Song recordings produced by Robert John "Mutt" Lange
Songs written by Rick Savage
Songs written by Joe Elliott
Songs written by Steve Clark